In jazz, a bar-line shift is a technique in which, during improvisation, one plays the chord from the measure before or after the given chord either intentionally or as an "accident."

Bar-line shifts may be caused by a novice having lost their place in the chord progression, but is most often attributable to: "(1)...harmonic generalization, as in the case of playing a II to V7 (+5, +9) progression [II-V-I turnaround] as only a V7 (+5, +9); or (2) the player wanted to play the previous chord (though it has already transpired), but was either pausing momentarily (as in taking a breath), and decides to adopt the 'better later than never' attitude." An example of a "very intentional" bar-line shift may be found on Cannonball Adderley's solo on "So What," "in which he deliberately enters and exits the bridge early, causing considerable tension, since the chord of the A section (D-) is one-half step lower than the chord of the bridge (E-)."

Outside of jazz a barline shift may be less than a bar, causing a change in the metric accent of the melody and its cadence.

See also
Side-slipping

Sources

Improvisation
Jazz terminology